The Catastrophist is the seventh studio album by American post-rock band Tortoise. It was released on Thrill Jockey in 2016. It features vocal contributions from Todd Rittman and Georgia Hubley.

Track listing

Charts

References

External links
 

2016 albums
Tortoise (band) albums
Thrill Jockey albums